Madeley railway station may refer to several stations in England:

 Madeley railway station (Staffordshire) (1837–1952), on the Grand Junction Railway
 Madeley railway station (Shropshire) (1837–1925), on the Great Western Railway
 Madeley Market railway station (1861–1960), in Shropshire, on the London and North Western Railway
 Madeley Road railway station (1870–1931), in Staffordshire, on the North Staffordshire Railway

See also
 Madeley Junction (disambiguation)